Compsolechia fasciella is a moth of the family Gelechiidae. It was described by Cajetan Felder, Rudolf Felder and Alois Friedrich Rogenhofer in 1875. It is found in Amazonas, Brazil.

References

Moths described in 1875
Compsolechia